

Official symbols of Newfoundland and Labrador 
Newfoundland and Labrador is one of Canada's provinces, and has established several official symbols.

Unofficial symbols of Labrador 
Labrador, the mainland portion of the province, has its own distinct cultural identity and has established several unofficial symbols for itself.

References

Newfoundland
Symbols
Canadian provincial and territorial symbols